Jeanne Added (born 25 September 1980 in Reims) is a French singer songwriter singing mainly in English. After starting as a jazz interpreter with various musicians, she launched her solo EP EP#1  in 2011 followed by an independent album Yes is a Pleasant Country also in 2011. She has released three albums and three EPs and a number of singles.

She was nominated for Album Revelation of the year category during Victoires de la musique for her debut album Be Sensational. Jeanne Added won the award of Best Female Artist during Victoires de la musique in 2019 and her album Radiate won Best Rock Album during the same event.

Discography

Albums

EPs
2011: EP#1
2015: EP
2019: Radiate (Alternative Takes)
2022: Au Revoir

Singles

*Did not appear in the official Belgian Ultratop 50 charts, but rather in the bubbling under Ultratip charts.

References

External links
Official website
Facebook

French women singers
French women singer-songwriters
1980 births
Living people
Musicians from Reims
Naïve Records artists